Nuclear Implosions: The Rise and Fall of the Washington Public Power Supply System is a 2008 book by Daniel Pope, a history professor at the University of Oregon, which traces the history of the Washington Public Power Supply System, a public agency which undertook to build five large nuclear power plants, one of the most ambitious U.S. construction projects in the 1970s.

By 1983, cost overruns and delays, along with a slowing of electricity demand growth, led to cancellation of two plants and a construction halt on two others. Moreover, the agency defaulted on $2.25 billion of municipal bonds, which is still the largest municipal bond default in U.S. history. The court case that followed took nearly a decade to resolve.

See also
Anti-nuclear movement in the United States
List of books about nuclear issues
Nuclear power in the United States
Satsop, Washington
Bond insurance

References

Books about politics of the United States
Nuclear power in the United States
2008 non-fiction books
Books about nuclear issues
Cambridge University Press books